A list of films produced in France in 1930:

See also
1930 in France

Notes

External links
French films of 1930 at IMDb
French films of 1930 at Cinema-francais.fr

1930
Lists of 1930 films by country or language
Films